Joé Dwèt Filé is a singer, songwriter and sound engineer of Haitian descent.

He was involved in music from a very young age through his church. He later moved to song with Afro-Caribbean influenced songs of mainly zouk and kompa songs. He was also involved in hits like "Que toi" of Stoney and "Un mot" of Axel Tony and "Mama hé" by Vegedream.

He formed his own band Lespada gaining further popularity on YouTube encouraging him to release a mixtape with them followed by own mixtape #ESOLF (Et Si On Le Faisait) in June 2018 followed by a 15-track studio album À deux on 29 March 2019. He also engaged in a tour that included France, Belgium, Switzerland, USA and at the Olympia in Montreal, Canada. He also appeared at the famous La Cigale in Paris. He released singles "À deux" in 2019 and "Egoïste" featuring Singuila and "Tu me mens" in 2020 with accompanied music videos established him further. On 18 April 2020, he released his EP Eira. His single "Jolie madame" in collaboration featuring Ronisia gave him his biggest charting hit on SNEP, the French Singles Chart.

Discography

Albums

Mixtape

EP

Singles
As lead singer

Featured in

Other songs

References

External links
YouTube channel

21st-century Haitian male singers
Living people
Year of birth missing (living people)